Vogel is a small lunar impact crater located to the southeast of Albategnius. It was named after the German astronomer Hermann Carl Vogel. It is the smallest member of a trio of craters that increase in size from north to south, consisting of Vogel, Argelander and Airy. To the west is the remnant of the crater Parrot.

Both the northern and southern ends of Vogel's rim are interrupted by smaller craters. Vogel B to the north is overlain in turn along its northern rim by an even smaller crater, thus forming a cluster of interconnected craters with Vogel being the largest. The rim of Vogel is otherwise relatively intact and not significantly worn.

Satellite craters

By convention these features are identified on lunar maps by placing the letter on the side of the crater midpoint that is closest to Vogel.

References

External links

Vogel at The Moon Wiki

Impact craters on the Moon